Ronaldus (Ron) Adrianus Maria Fouchier (born 13 October 1966) is a Dutch virologist who is Deputy head of the Erasmus MC Department of Viroscience, headed by Prof. Marion Koopmans.

Notability
Fouchier is notable for his research on respiratory viruses of humans and animals, antigenic drift, and influenza virus zoonoses, transmission and pandemics. His team contributed substantially to the identification and characterization of various “new” viruses, such as human metapneumovirus, human coronavirus NL63, SARS coronavirus, MERS coronavirus, and influenza A virus subtype H16.

Fouchier is elected member of the Royal Dutch Academy of Sciences (KNAW), the Royal Holland Society of Sciences and Humanities (KHMW) and Academia Europaea. In 2006 he received the Heine-Medin award of the European Society for Clinical Virology and in 2013 the Huibregtsen award for top innovative science with societal impact. He is a member of the CEIRR Center coordinated at the Icahn School of Medicine at Mount Sinai in New York City. Fouchier is a web-of-science Highly Cited author.

Awards and honours
2006 - Heine Medin award of the European Society for Clinical Virology 

2013 - Huibregtsen award for top innovative science with societal impact

Selected publications
Human metapneumovirus: A newly discovered human pneumovirus isolated from young children with respiratory tract disease van den Hoogen BG, de Jong JC, Groen J, Kuiken T, de Groot R, Fouchier RA, Osterhaus AD. Nat Med. 2001 Jun;7(6):719-24. doi: 10.1038/89098. PMID: 11385510 

Human coronavirus NL63: A previously undescribed coronavirus associated with respiratory disease in humans Fouchier RA, Hartwig NG, Bestebroer TM, Niemeyer B, de Jong JC, Simon JH, Osterhaus AD. Proc Natl Acad Sci U S A. 2004 Apr 20;101(16):6212-6. doi: 10.1073/pnas.0400762101. Epub 2004 Apr 8. PMID: 15073334 

SARS coronavirus: Aetiology: Koch's postulates fulfilled for SARS virus Fouchier RA, Kuiken T, Schutten M, van Amerongen G, van Doornum GJ, van den Hoogen BG, Peiris M, Lim W, Stöhr K, Osterhaus AD. Nature. 2003 May 15;423(6937):240. doi: 10.1038/423240a. PMID: 12748632 

MERS coronavirus: Isolation of a novel coronavirus from a man with pneumonia in Saudi Arabia  Zaki AM, van Boheemen S, Bestebroer TM, Osterhaus AD, Fouchier RA. N Engl J Med. 2012 Nov 8;367(19):1814-20. doi: 10.1056/NEJMoa1211721. Epub 2012 Oct 17. PMID: 23075143 

Influenza virus H16: Characterization of a novel influenza A virus hemagglutinin subtype (H16) obtained from black-headed gulls Fouchier RA, Munster V, Wallensten A, Bestebroer TM, Herfst S, Smith D, Rimmelzwaan GF, Olsen B, Osterhaus AD. J Virol. 2005 Mar;79(5):2814-22. doi: 10.1128/JVI.79.5.2814-2822.2005. PMID: 15709000

External links
 Prof. Ron Fouchier is member of the Royal Dutch Academy of Sciences (KNAW) KNAW / Ron Fouchier 
 Prof. Ron Fouchier is member of the Royal Holland Society of Sciences (KHMW) 
 Prof. Ron Fouchier is member of the Academia Europaea 
 Google Scholar Profile
 Scopus Profile
 The Mind of the Universe (in Dutch)
 Interview with virologist Ron Fouchier (in Dutch)
 Collaborating investigator of the CRIPT centre in CEIRR 
 Heine Medin award 
 Huibregtsenprijs 
 Podcast of the Royal Dutch Academy of Sciences (KNAW) about Planetary Health (in Dutch) 

Living people
Dutch virologists
Erasmus University Rotterdam
1966 births